A lava tube, or pyroduct, is a natural conduit formed by flowing lava from a volcanic vent that moves beneath the hardened surface of a lava flow. If lava in the tube empties, it will leave a cave.

Formation
A lava tube is a type of lava cave formed when a low-viscosity lava flow develops a continuous and hard crust, which thickens and forms a roof above the still-flowing lava stream. Tubes form in one of two ways:  either by the crusting over of lava channels, or from pāhoehoe flows where the lava is moving under the surface.

Lava usually leaves the point of eruption in channels. These channels tend to stay very hot as their surroundings cool. This means they slowly develop walls around them as the surrounding lava cools and/or as the channel melts its way deeper. These channels can get deep enough to crust over, forming an insulating tube that keeps the lava molten and serves as a conduit for the flowing lava. These types of lava tubes tend to be closer to the lava eruption point.

Farther away from the eruption point, lava can flow in an unchanneled, fan-like manner as it leaves its source, which is usually another lava tube leading back to the eruption point. Called pāhoehoe flows, these areas of surface-moving lava cool, forming either a smooth or rough, ropy surface. The lava continues to flow this way until it begins to block its source. At this point, the subsurface lava is still hot enough to break out at a point, and from this point the lava begins as a new "source". Lava flows from the previous source to this breakout point as the surrounding lava of the pāhoehoe flow cools. This forms an underground channel that becomes a lava tube.

Characteristics
A broad lava-flow field often consists of a main lava tube and a series of smaller tubes that supply lava to the front of one or more separate flows. When the supply of lava stops at the end of an eruption or lava is diverted elsewhere, lava in the tube system drains downslope and leaves partially empty caves.

Such drained tubes commonly exhibit step marks on their walls that mark the various depths at which the lava flowed, known as flow ledges or flow lines depending on how prominently they protrude from the walls. Lava tubes generally have pāhoehoe floors, although this may often be covered in breakdown from the ceiling.  A variety of speleothems may be found in lava tubes including a variety of stalactite forms generally known as lavacicles, which can be of the splash, "shark tooth", or tubular varieties. Lavacicles are the most common of lava tube speleothems. Drip stalagmites may form under tubular lava stalactites, and the latter may grade into a form known as a tubular lava helictite. A runner is a bead of lava that is extruded from a small opening and then runs down a wall. Lava tubes may also contain mineral deposits that most commonly take the form of crusts or small crystals, and less commonly, as stalactites and stalagmites. Some stalagmites may contain a central conduit and are interpreted as hornitos extruded from the tube floor.

A lava tube system in Kiama, Australia, consists of over 20 tubes, many of which are breakouts of a main lava tube. Other tubes have concentric and radial jointing features. The tubes are infilled due to the low slope angle of emplacement.

Extraterrestrial lava tubes 
Lunar lava tubes have been discovered and have been studied as possible human habitats, providing natural shielding from radiation.

Martian lava tubes are associated with innumerable lava flows and lava channels on the flanks of Olympus Mons. Partially collapsed lava tubes are visible as chains of pit craters, and broad lava fans formed by lava emerging from intact, subsurface tubes are also common.

Caves, including lava tubes, are considered interesting candidate biotopes for extraterrestrial life.

Notable examples

 Iceland
 Raufarhólshellir
 Surtshellir – For a long time, this was the longest known lava tube in the world.
 Kenya
 Leviathan Cave – At 12.5 kilometres, it is the longest lava tube in Africa.
Portugal
 Gruta das Torres – Lava tube system of the Azores.
South Korea
Manjang Cave – more than 8 kilometers long, located in Jeju Island, is a popular tourism spot.
 Spain
Cueva de los Verdes – Lava tube system. Lanzarote, Canary Islands.
 United States
 Lava River Cave in Oregon's Newberry National Volcanic Monument.

See also

Notes

 
Volcanology
Cave geology
Volcanic landforms